Rhododendron polycladum (多枝杜鹃) is a rhododendron species native to central and northwestern Yunnan in China, where it grows at altitudes of . The flowers are lavender to purple-blue.

Synonyms
 Rhododendron compactum Hutch.
 Rhododendron scintillans <small>Balf.f. & W.W.Sm.<.small>

References
 "Rhododendron polycladum", Franchet, Bull. Soc. Bot. France. 33: 234. 1886.

polycladum